This list of churches in  Fredensborg Municipality lists church buildings in Fredensborg Municipality, Denmark.

List

See also
 List of churches in Vordingborg Municipality
 List of churches in Faxe Municipality
 List of churches in Holbæk Municipality

References

External links

 Nordens kirker: Nordvestsjælland

 
Fredensborg